Live at Breeze's Metro Club is a live album recorded and released in 1986 by the Washington, D.C.-based go-go band Rare Essence. The album was recorded at the now defunct Breeze's Metro Club, a music venue formerly located on Bladensburg Road in the Gateway neighborhood of Northeast, Washington, D.C. The album is also referred to as The Album That Kept the Whole Neighborhood Rockin'.

The album includes the local hits in the D.C. music scene "Roll Call", "Shake It (But Don't Break It)", "One On One", and the nationwide hit "Do the Mickey", which is a remake of The Miracles 1963 song "Mickey's Monkey".  The song "Do the Mickey" is a homage to Rare Essence's conga player Milton "Go-Go Mickey" Freeman.

Track listing

Personnel
 James "Jas Funk" Thomas – lead vocals
 Quentin "Footz" Davidson – drums
 Milton "Go-Go Mickey" Freeman – congas, percussion
 Michael "Funky Ned" Neal – bass guitar
 Andre "Whiteboy" Johnson – electric guitar
 Byron "B.J." Jackson - keyboards
 John "J.B." Buchanan - keyboards, flugelhorn
 Donnell Griffin Floyd - saxophone
 David Green - timbales, backing vocals
 Derek Paige - trumpet
 Mike Neal – recording engineers, mixing
 Bill Mueller – engineer

References

External links
 Live at Breeze's Metro Club at Discogs.com

1986 live albums
Rare Essence albums
Live funk albums